Mark Henry David Cox (5 December 1905 – 27 March 1979) was an English cricketer.  Cox was a right-handed batsman who bowled right-arm slow.  He was born at Abington, Northamptonshire.

Cox made three first-class appearances for Northamptonshire in the 1932 County Championship against Gloucestershire, Kent, and Gloucestershire again.  In his three first-class matches, he scored 8 runs at an average of 2.00, with a high score of 5.  With the ball he took 2 wickets at a bowling average of 31.00, with best figures of 2/11.

He died at Pontypridd, Glamorgan, Wales on 27 March 1979.  His father, also called Mark, and brother, Arthur, both played first-class cricket.

References

External links
Mark Cox at ESPNcricinfo
Mark Cox at CricketArchive

1905 births
1979 deaths
Cricketers from Northampton
English cricketers
Northamptonshire cricketers
People from Abington, Northamptonshire